The Los Andes Peruvian University (UPLA) is an educational institution created on December 30, 1983 (Law Nº 23.757). The main campus is situated in Huancayo, Perú. It is one of the most prosperous  universities in the central region of the country. It is named after the Andes mountains, which surround the city of Huancayo.

History
At its inception in 1983, the university offered courses in the four areas of study most relevant and important to the region: Industrial Engineering, Agricultural Engineering, Business Management and Technology Education. On June 23, 1987 a Complementary Law Nº 24697 Civil Engineering was added to the program of studies.
More recently, new faculties have been established with a view to affording opportunities in new professional careers. Some of the original faculties have been upgraded, in accordance with technological and social requirements and in keeping with current innovations in tertiary education. These were authorized by Asamblea Nacional de Rectores, an institution which governs universities in Peru, with Resolution Nº 446-ANR-93 and Asamblea Universitaria Resolution Nº 001-93-AU on December 8, 1993.

Academic areas
Faculty of Medicine

Faculty of Health Science
UPLA Pharmacy and Biochemistry
UPLA Veterinary Medicine
UPLA Obstetrics
UPLA Dental Medicine
UPLA Optometry
UPLA Psychology
UPLA Nursing
UPLA Human Nutrition
UPLA Medical Technology
Faculty of Business Science and Accountancy
UPLA Accountancy and Finance
UPLA Management and Systems
Faculty of Law

Faculty of Education
UPLA Initial Education
UPLA Primary Education
UPLA Secondary Education
Faculty of Engineering
UPLA Computer and Systems Engineering
UPLA Civil Engineering
UPLA Architecture
UPLA Industrial Engineering

University, Industry and Society

Industry
In 1973 in Junín Region - Concepción, with the cooperation of Federal Republic of Germany, a milk plant was created. It was named "Fongal Centro". Today it is called The Milk Plant of Mantaro - PLEMSA and is part of Los Andes Peruvian University. It produces pasteurized milk, double and triple cream cheese, fresh cheese, yogurt and butter by professionals and students (who make theirs using practice-based professional learning).

Athletics
The University hosted its first marathon, the UPLA International Marathon, in 2008. Participants in this event include athletes from the surrounding regions as well as visiting athletes from other countries.

Alumni
Many of UPLA's alumni have had considerable success in scientific research, public service, education, and business.
Recently Inés Melchor has become recognized as a long-distance runner and lawyer.

See also
 List of universities in Peru

Footnotes

External links

Universidad Peruana Los Andes (UPLA) - Official site
YouTube institutional video - YouTube
Facebook community - Facebook
Telephone guide - UPLA phone numbers.
History and general reference(in spanish)

Universities in Peru
Educational institutions established in 1983
Buildings and structures in Junín Region
1983 establishments in Peru
Buildings and structures in Huancayo